Jonggak Station is a station on the Line 1 of the Seoul Subway in South Korea.  It is located on Jongno, central Seoul and comprises a large underground arcade.

The second-largest book shop in South Korea, the Bandi & Luni's lying under the Jongno Tower, which in turn is just above this station, is directly accessible from the station.

On every New Year's Day, the bell ceremony (Jeyaeui Jong Tajongsik) is held at Boshingak, the nearby bell pavilion. (The name of the station comes from this pavilion, jong meaning bell and gak pavilion.)  At those times the area is so crowded with tens of thousands of Seoulites that trains do not stop at Jonggak as to avoid any accidents.

Station layout

Surroundings
The following places are accessible from this station's exits as listed.
 Exit 1: Gwanghwamun; National Tax Office; U.S.A. Embassy; Seoul Fire and Accident Prevention Headquarters; Jongno Gu Office; Jongno Fire Station; Gwanghwamun Station (Line 5)
 Exit 2: Gongpyeon Dong; Anguk Dong; Jogyesa
 Exit 3: Insa Dong; Seoul YMCA
 Exit 4: Gwancheol Dong; Boshingak; Korea Development Bank
 Exit 5: Mugyo Dong; Gwanggyo; Insurance Agency; Korea Tourism Organization
 Exit 6: Seorim Dong; Gwanghwamun Post Office

References

Seoul Metropolitan Subway stations
Metro stations in Jongno District
Railway stations opened in 1974